Batasio tigrinus is a species of catfish (order Siluriformes) of the genus Batasio in the family Bagridae, known from Thailand. It is found in the hillstreams of Mae Klong and it was described from Khwae Noi River, one of the main tributaries of Mae Klong; its habitat is sandy/rocky substrate. It is sporadically collected as an ornamental fish; the threats are not well known but may be human disturbance and siltation.

References

Ng, H.H. 2012. Batasio tigrinus. The IUCN Red List of Threatened Species. Version 2014.3. <www.iucnredlist.org>. Downloaded on 18 May 2015.
Fishbase

Fish of Thailand
Fish described in 2001